Sabine Hossenfelder (born September 18, 1976) is a German theoretical physicist, science communicator, author, musician and YouTuber. She is the author of Lost in Math: How beauty leads physics astray, which explores the concept of elegance in fundamental physics and cosmology, and of Existential Physics: A scientist’s guide to life’s biggest questions.

Education 
Hossenfelder received an undergraduate degree in Mathematics in 1997 from the Johann Wolfgang Goethe-Universität in Frankfurt am Main. In 2004 she completed a doctorate in theoretical physics from the same institution with a thesis titled Schwarze Löcher in Extra-Dimensionen: Eigenschaften und Nachweis (she published a paper in the same year with a similar title in the journal Physics Letters B in English, titled "Black Hole Relics in Large Extra Dimensions").

Research 
Hossenfelder remained in Germany until 2004 as a postdoctoral researcher at the GSI Helmholtz Centre for Heavy Ion Research in Darmstadt. She was subsequently employed as a postdoctoral research fellow at the University of Arizona, Tucson, University of California, Santa Barbara, and later at the Perimeter Institute, Canada. She joined the Nordita Institute for Theoretical Physics in Sweden in 2009 as an assistant professor. She has been employed by the Frankfurt Institute for Advanced Studies between 2015 and 2022.

Public engagement and scientific achievements 
Hossenfelder is a freelance popular science writer who has written a blog since 2006. She contributes to the Forbes column "Starts with a Bang" as well as Quanta Magazine, New Scientist, Nature Physics, Scientific American, Nautilus Quarterly and Physics Today. 

Her 2018 book, Lost in Math, was also published in German with the title Das hässliche Universum (The Ugly Universe). Hossenfelder posits that the universe (and its particle model) is messy, and that it cannot be described by a mathematically beautiful Grand Unified Theory.

She currently runs an eponymous YouTube channel (subtitled "Science without the gobbledygook"). She also has a YouTube channel for music she writes and records.

In August 2022, Hossenfelder released a book titled Existential Physics: A Scientist's Guide to Life's Biggest Questions, published by Viking Press.

Personal life
She married Stefan Scherer in 2006. They have twin daughters born in 2010.

Selected publications  
 Lost in Math: How Beauty Leads Physics Astray. Basic Books, 2018.
 Existential Physics: A Scientist's Guide to Life's Biggest Questions. Viking Press, 2022.

References

External links 
 
 
 

1976 births
21st-century German physicists
21st-century German women scientists
German cosmologists
German science writers
German women physicists
Women relativity theorists
German relativity theorists
Quantum gravity physicists
Philosophers of physics
Living people
Science writers
German YouTubers